The Research Centre for Linguistic Typology (RCLT) was a research institute founded in 1998 at the Australian National University in Canberra by R. M. W. Dixon. It moved to La Trobe University in Bundoora, a suburb of Melbourne (Australia), in 2000. It was an internationally well-recognized centre that was specialized in fieldwork linguistics, language documentation and linguistic typology, and was especially focussed on "the Tibeto-Burman family and the languages of the Amazon and Papua New Guinea".

Dixon and Alexandra Aikhenvald headed this institute up to 2008, when they accepted a position at James Cook University in Cairns, after which Professor Randy LaPolla became the director. It was reorganized and rebranded as the Centre for Research on Language Diversity.

References

External links
 
 

Linguistic research institutes
Research institutes in Australia